Peperomia ventenatii is a species of epiphyte in the pepper family. It grows in wet tropical biomes. It was first described by Friedrich Miquel in 1843.

Etymology
The specific name ventenatii was given in honor of the Frnech botanis Étienne Pierre Ventenat.

Subspecies
Two subspecies, both described by Miquel, are accepted: P. v. f. pubescens and P. v. var. pubescens.

Distribution
Peperomia ventenatii is native to the Philippines and Indonesia.

References

ventenatii
Flora of Southeast Asia
Flora of Indonesia
Flora of the Philippines
Plants described in 1843
Taxa named by Friedrich Anton Wilhelm Miquel